Equity Bank may refer to:

Equity Bank Group, now known as Equity Group Holdings, an African financial services company
Equity Bank Congo, now known as Equity Banque Commerciale du Congo
Equity Bank Kenya Limited
Equity Bank Rwanda Limited
Equity Bank South Sudan Limited
Equity Bank Tanzania Limited
Equity Bank Uganda Limited
Equity Bank (United States), based in the American state of Kansas